École Française Docteur René Guillet is a French international school in Thiès, Senegal. It serves levels petite section (preschool) through terminale, the final year of lycée (senior high school). It had 134 students as of the 2014–2015 school year. It uses the distance education programme from the National Centre for Distance Education (CNED) for collège (junior high school) and lycée.

References

External links
 École Française Docteur René Guillet 

French international schools in Senegal